Ignacio Astigarraga (born 12 September 1936) is a Spanish former cyclist. He competed in the individual road race and team time trial events at the 1960 Summer Olympics.

References

External links
 

1936 births
Living people
People from Durango, Biscay
Spanish male cyclists
Olympic cyclists of Spain
Cyclists at the 1960 Summer Olympics
Sportspeople from Biscay
Cyclists from the Basque Country (autonomous community)